Charektar is a village de facto in the Shahumyan Province of the breakaway Republic of Artsakh, de jure in the Kalbajar District of Azerbaijan, in the disputed region of Nagorno-Karabakh. The village had an Azerbaijani-majority population prior to their exodus during the First Nagorno-Karabakh War.

Etymology 
The name Charektar is of Persian origin.

History 

During the Soviet period, the village was a part of the Mardakert District of the Nagorno-Karabakh Autonomous Oblast, and was incorporated into the Shahumyan Province of the Republic of Artsakh after the First Nagorno-Karabakh War.

Historical heritage sites 
Historical heritage sites in and around the village include the 12th/13th-century Charektar Monastery and a 12th/13th-century khachkar.

Economy and culture 
The population is mainly engaged in agriculture and animal husbandry. As of 2015, the village has a municipal building, a secondary school, and a medical centre.

Demographics 
In 1912, the village had 199 inhabitants, mostly Caucasian Tatars (Azerbaijanis). In 1993 the village had 202 Azerbaijani inhabitants. The inhabitants of the village fled during the First Nagorno-Karabakh War and Charektar was subsequently settled by Armenians.

The village had an Armenian-majority population of 159 inhabitants in 2005, and 262 inhabitants in 2015.

Gallery

References

External links 

 

Populated places in Shahumyan Province
Populated places in Kalbajar District